The 1968 ABA Playoffs was the postseason tournament following the American Basketball Association's inaugural 1967-1968 season, starting on March 23 and ending on May 4. The tournament concluded with the Eastern Division champion Pittsburgh Pipers defeating the Western Division champion New Orleans Buccaneers, four games to three in the ABA Finals.

* Division winner
Bold Series winner
Italic Team with home-court advantage

Notable events

This was the first ABA championship.

The Pittsburgh Pipers won the ABA championship in the playoffs after posting the league's best record during the regular season (54-24, .692).  The Minnesota Muskies had the league's second best record, but they played in the Eastern Division with the Pipers.

None of the four teams that made it to the Division finals (and ABA finals) remained as they were during this season throughout the league's entire existence.  The Pittsburgh Pipers spent the following season as the Minnesota Pipers, returned to play as the Pittsburgh Pipers the year after that, and then played two seasons as the Pittsburgh Condors before folding in 1972. After three seasons the New Orleans Buccaneers left town and became the Memphis Pros in 1970.  The Minnesota Muskies spent the next two seasons as the Miami Floridians and then spent two seasons after that as The Floridians before folding in 1972.  The Dallas Chaparrals eventually became the San Antonio Spurs, continuing to this day in the NBA.

The Kentucky Colonels won the last Eastern Division playoff berth in a one-game playoff over the New Jersey Americans by forfeit when the venue chosen by the Americans, Commack Arena, had an unplayable floor.

Connie Hawkins of the Pittsburgh Pipers was the Most Valuable Player of the ABA playoffs.

Division Semifinals

Eastern Division Semifinals

(1) Pittsburgh Pipers vs. (3) Indiana Pacers

This was the first playoff meeting between the Pipers and the Pacers.

(2) Minnesota Muskies vs. (4) Kentucky Colonels

This was the first playoff meeting between the Muskies and the Colonels.

Western Division Semifinals

(1) New Orleans Buccaneers vs. (3) Denver Rockets

This was the first playoff meeting between the Buccaneers and the Rockets.

(2) Dallas Chaparrals vs. (4) Houston Mavericks

This was the first playoff meeting between the Chaparrals and the Mavericks.

Division Finals

Eastern Division Finals

(1) Pittsburgh Pipers vs. (2) Minnesota Muskies

This was the first playoff meeting between these two teams.

Western Division Finals

(1) New Orleans Buccaneers vs. (2) Dallas Chaparrals

This was the first playoff meeting between the Buccaneers and the Chaparrals.

ABA Finals: (W1) New Orleans Buccaneers vs. (E1) Pittsburgh Pipers

Series summary

Series results

This was the first playoff meeting between the Pipers and the Buccaneers.

External links
RememberTheABA.com page on 1968 ABA playoffs
Basketball-Reference.com's 1968 ABA Playoffs page

Playoffs
American Basketball Association playoffs